USS Haraden may refer to the following ships of the United States Navy:

The ship was assigned to Canada and renamed HMCS Columbia. She was sold for scrap in 1945.

United States Navy ship names